Unique Eats is a TV series on Cooking Channel about various restaurants across the United States and their signature dishes. The show features talking head interviews with various chefs and food critics who give their judgement about the foods. Each episode focuses on one theme, such as "comfort foods" or "desserts".

Regular cast
The Unique Eats cast is made up of food industry professionals; such as chefs, restaurateurs, cookbook authors, food writers and even home cooks who all describe their favorite dishes at eating establishments featured in each episode.

Episode list

Season 1 (2010)

Season 2 (2010-2011)

Season 3 (2011)

Season 4 (2011-2012)

Season 5 (2012)

Season 6 (2013)

References

External links 
 Official site
 
 

Cooking Channel original programming
2010 American television series debuts
2013 American television series endings